The North Rim Road, Black Canyon of the Gunnison National Park, near Crawford, Colorado was built during 1933–38. 
It is an approximately five mile long roadway, with viewpoints and associated structures.  It is recognized as a "designed landscape".  It includes five overlooks over the Black Canyon of the Gunnison.

Construction
Designed by the National Park Service's NPS-Engineering Branch, the road would be built by the Civilian Conservation Corps Designers included T.W. Secrest, who received input from NPS landscape architects including Thomas Chalmers Vint, Howard M. Baker, and Charles A. Richey.

Listing
It was listed as a historic district on the National Register of Historic Places in 2005;  the listing also termed it the North Rim Road Historic District.   The district includes five contributing buildings, six contributing sites and 11 other contributing structures.

References

Roads on the National Register of Historic Places in Colorado
Buildings and structures completed in 1933
Buildings and structures in Montrose County, Colorado
Transportation in Montrose County, Colorado
Historic districts on the National Register of Historic Places in Colorado
National Register of Historic Places in Montrose County, Colorado
National Register of Historic Places in national parks